Breezy is a distributed and client–server revision control system. It is a friendly fork of the dormant GNU Bazaar (formerly Bazaar-NG) system.

Breezy brings features like Python 3 and Git support to the Bazaar-based codebase. Many plugins are also merged in as an integral part of the fork.

References

External links
 
 Breezy in Launchpad

Distributed version control systems
Free software programmed in Python
Free version control software
Python (programming language) software